Abdoulaye Sogue (born July 5, 1965) is a Senegalese former professional footballer who played as a striker.

External links
Abdoulaye Sogue profile at chamoisfc79.fr

1965 births
Living people
Senegalese footballers
Association football forwards
Chamois Niortais F.C. players
Ligue 2 players
OFC Charleville players